Teen Knight (later released on DVD under the title: Medieval Park) is a 1999 Canadian-Romanian fantasy Action-Adventure family film directed by Phil Comeau and starring Kris Lemche, Caterina Scorsone, Benjamin Plener, Paul Soles and Kimberly Pullis. The film was released on VHS on January 19, 1999 in North America by Pulsepounders. In 2012, it was released on DVD for the first time by Echo Bridge Home Entertainment and again in 2013 under a different title Medieval Park released by Moonbeam Films.

Plot
17-year-old teenage medieval fan Peter wins a contest for a "Medieval Adventure" from a soft drink company. The winners, plus a film crew from the soda company arrive at the castle for the adventure. During the night, a spell cast over 600 years prior brings the castle and all the people in it back to 1383. The evil Lord Raykin plans on retrying to take the castle. It is up to the group to stop him, and thereby return to the 20th century. They enlist the help of the former court magician, Percival, to help them.

Cast
Kris Lemche: Peter
Caterina Scorsone: Alison
Benjamin Plener: Ben
Paul Soles: Mr. Percy/Percival
Kimberly Pullis: Claudia
Marc Robinson: Lord Raykin
Claudiu Trandafir: Eriuk
Dan Fintescu: Tommy
Eugen Cristea: Wiggins
Mihai Gruia Sandu: Phil
Mihai Verbintschi: Dungeon Master
Christian Nicolae: Gary
Juliana Ciugulea: Mom
Marius Galea: Hugo
Ioana Anghel: Mrs. Sweeny
Steven Bunker: Jimmy
Dan Franculescu: Kyle
Dimitrii Bogomaz: Knight
Liva Constantin: Natalie
Mircea Caraman: Soldier

References

External links
 

1999 films
1999 fantasy films
Films about dragons
Films set in the Middle Ages
English-language Canadian films
English-language Romanian films
Canadian fantasy films
Romanian fantasy films
1990s English-language films
1990s Canadian films